The West Galician code (also The civil code of Western Galicia, rarely  — ) was a civil code created in the 18th century and introduced in West Galicia, an administrative region of the Habsburg monarchy, created after the Third Partition of Poland, prior to the introduction of ABGB, the civil code of Austria. It contained little in the way of solving feudal-class problems and was based on the laws of nature.

Publications of the Code  
 Codex civilis pro Galicia occidentali. — Wien, 1797. (In Latin)

Kingdom of Galicia and Lodomeria
Civil codes